Steggles may refer to:

 Steggles (surname), a family name originating from Old English
 Steggles Pty Ltd, an Australian poultry business under Baiada Poultry

See also 
 Steagles, a temporary National Football League team